Humanitaire! is a 2007 film.

Synopsis
A road. A truck. A refugee camp. Every day, Barou, a humanitarian, sets out on the highway to bring refugees back to a shelter. Every day, the refugees of the camp hope to see their loved ones come back after losing them during the exodus. It's the tragic daily routine of an African refugee camp.

Awards
 FCAT 2008

External links

 

2007 films
French drama short films
2000s French films